Winchester is a constituency in Hampshire represented in the House of Commons of the UK Parliament since 2010 by Steve Brine, a Conservative.

Constituency profile
The constituency is in mid-Hampshire and comprises the northern bulk of the large City of Winchester District as well as Chandler's Ford and Hiltingbury in the Borough of Eastleigh. The largest settlement is Winchester.

Boundaries 

1918–1950: The Borough of Winchester, the Urban District of Eastleigh and Bishopstoke, the Rural Districts of Hursley and Winchester, and the Rural District of South Stoneham except the parish of Bittern.

1950–1955: The Boroughs of Eastleigh, Romsey, and Winchester, in the Rural District of Romsey and Stockbridge the parishes of Ampfield, Chilworth, East Dean, Lockerley, Melchet Park and Plaitford, Michelmersh, Mottisfont, North Baddesley, Nursling and Rownhams, Romsey Extra, Sherfield English, and Wellow, and part of the Rural District of Winchester.

1955–1974: The Boroughs of Romsey and Winchester, and parts of the Rural Districts of Romsey and Stockbridge, and Winchester.

1974–1983: The Municipal Boroughs of Andover and Winchester, the Rural District of Andover, and parts of the Rural Districts of Romsey and Stockbridge, and Winchester.

1983–1997: The City of Winchester wards of Bishop's Sutton, Bishop's Waltham, Cheriton, Compton, Durley and Upham, Itchen Valley, Littleton, Micheldever, New Alresford, Olivers Battery, Otterbourne and Hursley, Owlesbury and Colden Common, St Barnabas, St Bartholomew, St John and All Saints, St Luke, St Michael, St Paul, Sparsholt, The Worthys, Twyford, Upper Meon Valley, and Wonston, and the District of East Hampshire wards of Alton Holybourne, Alton North East, Alton North West, Alton South East, Alton South West and Beech, Farringdon, Four Marks, Medstead, North Downland and Ropley, and West Tisted.

1997–2010: The City of Winchester.

2010–present: The City of Winchester wards of Colden Common and Twyford, Compton and Otterbourne, Itchen Valley, Kings Worthy, Littleton and Harestock, Olivers Battery and Badger Farm, St Barnabas, St Bartholomew, St John and All Saints, St Luke, St Michael, St Paul, Sparsholt, The Alresfords, and Wonston and Micheldever, and the Borough of Eastleigh wards of Chandler's Ford East, Chandler's Ford West, Hiltingbury East, and Hiltingbury West.

Parliament accepted the Boundary Commission's Fifth Periodic Review of Westminster constituencies by making slight changes to this constituency for the 2010 general election, removing 11 mostly rural wards in and around Bishops Waltham to a new seat, Meon Valley.  In return, Winchester gained four suburban and partially urban wards at the northern edge of Eastleigh.

History

1295–1885 
The chartered city sent burgesses (equivalent to advisory MPs) to the Model Parliament of 1295 and then to most Parliaments convened by the monarch in the medieval period and thereafter; its representation being fixed at two in number during this long period of English history.  As is common, major disruption in representation caused by both infrequency of Parliaments convened and allegiance of the incumbents (whether a Royalist or a Parliamentarian) led to sporadic representation during the Protectorate of England and its Commonwealth which followed the end of most fighting during the English Civil War, in this case the stripping of wealth and status from Sir William Ogle followed his being supportive of the wrong faction at the wrong time.

1885–present 
The Redistribution of Seats Act 1885 reduced the narrow borough constituency that elected two MPs to only one, permitting the creation of new broader replacement seats in surrounding Hampshire countryside for two abolished boroughs: Andover and Fareham (also known as West and South Hampshire respectively).

Political history 
The seat was a Conservative safe seat in terms of majority and length of time held from 1950 until 1997.

At the 1997 general election the incumbent MP Gerry Malone of the Conservative Party was defeated by Mark Oaten of the Liberal Democrats by just two votes. This was the closest result in any of the 659 constituencies contested at the 1997 general election, followed by the Liberal Democrats 12 vote majority (also over the Conservatives) in Torbay.  Malone petitioned the result and it was declared void by the High Court on the grounds of mis-stamped ballots having altered the outcome, necessitating a by-election.  This was won definitively by Oaten with a very large majority of 21,556, in an election that saw the Labour vote collapse to 1.7% hence the candidate, Patrick Davies, losing his deposit.

The events of 1997 swung the constituency strongly away from its usual status as a fairly safe Conservative seat.

Avoidance of confusion in party names
The candidacy of Richard Huggett in both 1997 elections as a "Literal Democrat" candidate led in part to the creation of the Registration of Political Parties Act 1998.

Oaten stood down at the 2010 general election and was replaced as Liberal Democrat candidate by Martin Tod.  Following significant boundary changes, Tod was defeated by Conservative candidate Steve Brine, who took the seat with a majority of 3,048 votes. Brine held the seat in 2015, 2017 and  2019, although in 2019 his majority was reduced to just 985 votes over Paula Ferguson of the Liberal Democrats, making Winchester one of the most marginal seats in the UK.

Prominent frontbenchers
Sir George Hennessy was a senior whip (Vice-Chamberlain of the Household then Treasurer of the Household) from 1925 to 1929, being given the style 'sir' through a baronetcy in 1927.
Peter Smithers resigned the seat in 1964 to serve as Secretary General of the Council of Europe until 1969.
Gerry Malone became a Health Minister in 1994.
Mark Oaten became Liberal Democrat Home Affairs Spokesman from 2003 until January 2006.

Constituency profile
The ancient capital of Wessex, Winchester is a cathedral city with the arts and humanities-oriented University and an affluent population. Poverty is very low, and the population is a mixture of students, academics, London and Southampton commuters, and those employed locally in high-tech and creative industries.

The only other large settlement in the constituency is Chandler's Ford which has over 21,000 residents and is largely a dormitory town. The constituency also includes several villages, mostly to the north and east of Winchester, including Micheldever, New Alresford and Kings Worthy. Much of the rural territory previously in the constituency was moved to Meon Valley from the 2010 general election.

Workless claimants who were registered jobseekers were in November 2012 significantly lower than the national average of 3.8%, at 1.4% of the population based on a statistical compilation by The Guardian.

Members of Parliament
Constituency created (1295)

1295–1660

MPs 1660–1885

MPs since 1885

Elections

Elections in the 2010s

Elections in the 2000s 

Note: The percentage differences are compared to the previous general election poll, not the by-election.

Elections in the 1990s 

Note: The result reflects the official return made at the time. It was subsequently declared void upon petition.
Because of the presence on the ballot paper of Richard Huggett as "Liberal Democrat Top Choice for Parliament", Oaten used the description "Liberal Democrat: Leader: Paddy Ashdown" to identify himself as the official Liberal Democrat candidate.

Elections in the 1980s

Elections in the 1970s

Elections in the 1960s

Elections in the 1950s

Election in the 1940s

Elections in the 1930s

Elections in the 1920s

Election results 1885-1918

Elections in the 1880s 

Tottenham's death caused a by-election.

Elections in the 1890s

Elections in the 1900s

Elections in the 1910s 

General Election 1914/15:

Another General Election was required to take place before the end of 1915. The political parties had been making preparations for an election to take place and by July 1914, the following candidates had been selected; 
Unionist: Guy Baring
Liberal:

Election results 1832-1885

Elections in the 1830s

Elections in the 1840s

Elections in the 1850s

Elections in the 1860s
East's resignation caused a by-election.

 
 
 

Carter was appointed a Lord Commissioner of the Treasury, requiring a by-election.

Elections in the 1870s

Elections in the 1880s

Elections before 1832

Elections in the 1830s

See also
List of parliamentary constituencies in Hampshire

Notes

References

Parliamentary constituencies in Hampshire
Constituencies of the Parliament of the United Kingdom established in 1295
Politics of Winchester